Gatesclarkeana senior is a moth of the family Tortricidae. It is found in Indonesia, the Philippines and Taiwan.

The wingspan is 16–18 mm for males and 15-18.5 mm for females. The forewings are light ochreous. The hindwings are fuscous with a purplish gloss.

The larvae have been reared from the leaves of Peltophorum pterocarpum and Lantana species.

References

Moths described in 1966
Gatesclarkeanini